Alan R. Drengson (1934–2022) was a Canadian philosopher.

Background 
Alan Drengson served as the editor of the Trumpeter: Journal of Ecosophy from 1983 to 1997. Alan Drengson's papers associated with the journal are housed in the archives of the University of Victoria Libraries. Marti Kheel's commentary on Alan Drengson's work with The Trumpeter is held in  the Schlesinger Library (Harvard University).

In 1986, Environmental Ethics reported that Drengson had "published in a wide variety of periodicals" and that he had taught courses "in Eastern philosophy, environmental philosophy, philosophy of technology, philosophy of religion, and philosophy of history." In 1994, David Clarke Burks stated that “Alan Drengson is an Associate Professor of philosophy at the University of Victoria, B.C., Canada. He is the founder and editor of The Trumpeter and author of Beyond Environmental Crisis.”

Drengon's work has been cited by several other environmental philosophers; for example, in "Cultural Relativism and Environmental Ethics", Lawrence T. Willett wrote that "Environmental philosophers are trying to develop a global ethic; see, e.g. Alan Drengson's definitions in the Trumpeter." In 1989, the Vancouver Sun wrote that Drengson "was raised Christian but no longer attends church."

Drengson wrote the introduction to Arne Næss's The Ecology of Wisdom. Editor Bill Devall wrote "this anthology begins with an exploration of Arne's life and work by Alan Drengson. This essay explores how Arne developed and articulated his own life philosophy grounded in a place."

Bibliography 
Per OCLC WorldCat unless cited otherwise.

Non-fiction 
 A Study of Collingwood's Philosophy of History, 1960, 
 Self Deception, 1971 
 Shifting Paradigms: From Technocrat to Planetary Person, 1983, 
 Beyond Environmental Crisis, 1989, 
 Doc Forest and Blue Mountain Ecostery, 1993 
 An Ecophilosopher's Dictionary: Basic Concepts for Ecocentric Exploration, 1994, 
 The Practice of Technology, 1995, 
 Ecoforestry: The Art & Science Of Sustainable Forest Use, 2000, 
 Wild Way Home: Spiruality for a New Millennium, 2010,

Edited volumes 
 The Philosophy of Society, 1978 
The Deep Ecology Movement, 1995, 
 The Selected Works of Arne Næss, 2005,

Poetry 
 Sacred Journey I: Land of Visions and Dreams, 1977, 
 Sacred Journey II: A Wilderness Celebration, 1978 
 Sacred Journey III: Community in the Sun, 1979,

References

External links 
 Official website

1934 births
2022 deaths
Academic staff of the University of Victoria
Canadian philosophers